"Surangani" was originally a Sinhalese Baila song. The Tamil version was written and sung by A E Manoharan. The song has been dubbed in many languages.

Manoharan did a bilingual Sinhala /Tamil rendition of the song which became quite popular in Tamil Nadu, mainly due to Radio Ceylon. Ilayaraja then made a Tamil version – which had very little to do with the Sinhala version except for the refrain – for the Tamil film Avar Enakke Sontham, sung by Malaysia Vasudevan and Renuka. This became popular around secondary schools and colleges in Chennai. Tamil students took it to other universities around India.

A Goan, Konkani version was also made, and many people in India mistakenly believed this was the original.

It has featured in translated versions in several Indian movies, in both Tamil- notably the Sivaji Ganesan movie Thanga Padhakkam – and Hindi- it was sung by Asha Bhosle in Parmatma. The song was remixed by Vijay Antony in 2008 film Pandhayam.

References

External links
 Lyrics of Surangani from Avar Enakke Sontham

Sri Lankan music